Alexander Douglas-Hamilton may refer to:

Alexander Douglas-Hamilton, 10th Duke of Hamilton
Alexander Douglas-Hamilton, 16th Duke of Hamilton

See also
Alexander Douglas (disambiguation)
Alexander Hamilton (disambiguation)